974 Lioba (prov. designation:  or ) is a stony background asteroid from the central regions of the asteroid belt, approximately  in diameter. It was discovered on 18 March 1922, by astronomer Karl Reinmuth at the Heidelberg-Königstuhl State Observatory in southern Germany. The S-type asteroid has a longer than average rotation period of 38.7 hours. It was named after missionary Saint Leoba (Lioba).

Orbit and classification 

Lioba is a non-family asteroid of the main belt's background population when applying the hierarchical clustering method to its proper orbital elements. It orbits the Sun in the central asteroid belt at a distance of 2.3–2.8 AU once every 4.04 years (1,474 days; semi-major axis of 2.53 AU). Its orbit has an eccentricity of 0.11 and an inclination of 5° with respect to the ecliptic.

Naming 

This minor planet was named after Saint Leoba (also Lioba) (c. 710–782), abbess in Tauberbischofsheim, Germany, who helped Saint Boniface spreading Christianity throughout Germany. In 782, she was buried near Bonifatius in Fulda, Germany. The author of the Dictionary of Minor Planet Names confirmed the naming from private communications with Dutch astronomer Ingrid van Houten-Groeneveld, who worked as a young astronomer at Heidelberg.

Physical characteristics 

In the Tholen classification, Lioba is a common stony S-type asteroid.

Rotation period 

In May 1984, a rotational lightcurve of Lioba was obtained from photometric observations by American astronomer Richard Binzel during a survey of 130 asteroids at the University of Texas McDonald Observatory and Cerro Tololo Inter-American Observatory. Lightcurve analysis gave a well-defined, longer-than average rotation period of 38.7 hours with a brightness amplitude of 0.37 magnitude. In April 2007, a poorly rated period determination by French amateur astronomer René Roy gave  or more.

Diameter and albedo 

The Collaborative Asteroid Lightcurve Link derives an albedo of 0.3609 from the IRAS results, and calculates a diameter of 18.23 kilometers based on an absolute magnitude of 11.8.

References

External links 
 Lightcurve Database Query (LCDB), at www.minorplanet.info
 Dictionary of Minor Planet Names, Google books
 Asteroids and comets rotation curves, CdR – Geneva Observatory, Raoul Behrend
 Discovery Circumstances: Numbered Minor Planets (1)-(5000) – Minor Planet Center
 
 

000974
Discoveries by Karl Wilhelm Reinmuth
Named minor planets
000974
19220318